Arenibacter is a rod-shaped and strictly aerobic genus from the family of Flavobacteriaceae.

References

Further reading 
 
 

Flavobacteria
Bacteria genera